Conus richardsae is a species of sea snail, a marine gastropod mollusk in the family Conidae, the cone snails and their allies.

Like all species within the genus Conus, these snails are predatory and venomous. They are capable of "stinging" humans, therefore live ones should be handled carefully or not at all.

Description
The size of the shell varies between 32 mm and 48 mm.

Distribution
This marine species occurs off the Philippines and New Caledonia

References

 Filmer R.M. (2001). A Catalogue of Nomenclature and Taxonomy in the Living Conidae 1758–1998. Backhuys Publishers, Leiden. 388pp.
 Filmer R.M. (2009) A catalogue of nomenclature and taxonomy in the living Conidae 1758–1998. Corrections to original text, amendments and updates 1998–2008. 20 pp.
 Puillandre N., Duda T.F., Meyer C., Olivera B.M. & Bouchet P. (2015). One, four or 100 genera? A new classification of the cone snails. Journal of Molluscan Studies. 81: 1–23

External links
 The Conus Biodiversity website
 
Cone Shells – Knights of the Sea

richardsae
Gastropods described in 1992